Gordon Cumming is a Scottish former footballer who played as a winger for English clubs Arsenal and Reading.

Career
Cumming was born on 23 January 1948 in Johnstone, Scotland. His primary position was as a winger. He started his playing career at Scottish team Glasgow United. Cumming then moved to London, joining Arsenal where he won the FA Youth Cup in 1966. He then spent the next three years at Highbury before moving to Reading in 1969. There, he was the primary taker of penalties until the arrivals of Robin Friday and Alan Taylor. He was Reading's player of the year in 1971–72. In 1975–76, Cumming played in the Reading team that won promotion to the Third Division. In all, he scored 61 goals in 331 games for the Royals.

Personal life
Cumming retired from football in 1978 and went on to open a restaurant. Cumming is married to wife Christina and has two daughters, Susan and Amanda.

Honours

Club
Arsenal
FA Youth Cup: 1966

Individual
Reading FC Player of the Year.

References 

1948 births
Living people
People from Johnstone
Footballers from Renfrewshire
Scottish footballers
Association football wingers
Arsenal F.C. players
Reading F.C. players
English Football League players